Aradelloides is a genus of feather-legged bugs in the Holoptilinae subfamily. It is endemic to Australia and three species have been described.

Species list
Aradelloides maculatus Malipatil, 1983
Aradelloides taylori Malipatil, 1983
Aradelloides wilsoni Malipatil, 1983

References

Reduviidae
Hemiptera of Australia
Cimicomorpha genera